Bavel  is a khum (commune) of Bavel District in Battambang Province in north-western Cambodia.

Villages

 Bavel Muoy
 Bavel Pir
 Tumnob Tuek
 Dach Proat
 Sangkae Vear
 Peam
 Kampong Pnov
 Stueng Dach
 Spean Dach
 Sang Reang
 Svay Chrum
 Doun Avav
 Prey Totueng Muoy
 Prey Totueng Pir
 Kouk
 Sla Khlanh
 Kampong Chhnang Muoy
 Kampong Chhnang Pir
 Samaki

References

Communes of Battambang province
Bavel District